Bucculatrix cristatella is a species of moth of the family Bucculatricidae. It is found in most of Europe (except the Iberian Peninsula and the Balkan Peninsula). It was described in 1839 by Philipp Christoph Zeller.

The wingspan is about 7 mm. The head is ochreous-yellowish to light yellowish -fuscous. Forewings are shining ochreous-grey. Hindwings grey. The larva is pale greenish; dorsal and subdorsal lines darker; dots whitish and the head pale brown. Plate of 2 yellowish, brown-dotted.

Adults are on wing from May to June and again from July to August. There are two generations per year.

The larvae feed on Achillea millefolium, Anthemis tinctoria, Chrysanthemum species and Leucanthemopsis alpina. They mine the leaves of their host plant. The mine consists of a very fine corridor along the leaf margin, mainly in the lower leaves. The frass is deposited in a narrow central line. The larva might abandon the mine and restart elsewhere. Older larvae live free, and feed by slicing open the margin of a leaf segment near its tip and eating away tissue, resulting in a number of full depth blotch mines. Last instar larvae feed freely on the leaf.

References

External links

 Plant Parasites of Europe
 UKmoths
  Images representing Bucculatrix cristatella at Consortium for the Barcode of Life

Bucculatricidae
Leaf miners
Moths described in 1839
Moths of Europe
Taxa named by Philipp Christoph Zeller